The 1934 Howard Bison football team was an American football team that represented Howard University as a member of the Colored Intercollegiate Athletic Association (CIAA) during the 1934 college football season. The team was led by Charles Fremont West who returned for his second season as head coach after helming the team in 1928. The Bison finished the season with an overall record of 4–2–2 and a conference mark of 3–1–2.

Schedule

References

Howard
Howard Bison football seasons
Howard Bison football